Damage and Joy is the seventh studio album by Scottish alternative rock band the Jesus and Mary Chain, released on 24 March 2017 by Artificial Plastic Records. It is the group's first album in 19 years, and marks their first collaboration with producer Youth.

Half of the album's songs had appeared previously in different versions: an earlier recording of "All Things Pass" was released on the 2008 Heroes soundtrack as "All Things Must Pass"; "Song for a Secret" and "Amputation" were released by Jim Reid, the latter as a solo single in 2007 under the title "Dead End Kids"; "Can't Stop the Rock" was released by Sister Vanilla, the Reids' sister Linda; and "The Two of Us", "Get on Home", and "Facing Up to the Facts" were released by Jim's band Freeheat.

Reception

Track listing

Personnel
Credits adapted from the liner notes of Damage and Joy.

Musicians

 Bernadette Denning – vocals 
 Isobel Campbell – vocals 
 Linda Fox – vocals 
 Sky Ferreira – vocals 
 Brian Young – drums
 Phil King – guitar 
 Chris Phillips – drums

Technical

 Youth – production 
 Michael Rendall – engineering, mixing
 Jamie McEvoy – mixing assistance
 The Jesus and Mary Chain – production 
 Dave Trumfio – pre-production 
 Josiah Mazzaschi – engineering 
 Jamie Grashion – additional engineering
 Conor Brady – additional engineering
 Tommaso Colliva – additional mix engineering
 Marcus Locock – additional mix engineering
 John Davis – mastering at Metropolis Mastering (London)
 Rachel Willett – cover photo

Charts

References

2017 albums
Albums produced by Youth (musician)
The Jesus and Mary Chain albums